Garry Lowe (born 31 December 1953) is a former Australian rules footballer who played with Essendon in the Victorian Football League (VFL). He later played 2 seasons for Northcote in the VFA before retiring due to reoccurring leg injuries in 1977 at the age of 24. Garry suffered a massive heart attack at the age of 66 in 2019 which he survived and is now back to regularly cycling to assist his recovery and maintain fitness.

Notes

External links 
		

Essendon Football Club past player profile

Living people
1953 births
Australian rules footballers from Victoria (Australia)
Essendon Football Club players
Essendon District Football League players
Eltham Football Club players